Charles Francis Sweeney (April 15, 1890 – March 13, 1955) was an outfielder in Major League Baseball. He played one game for the Philadelphia Athletics in 1914.

References

External links

1890 births
1955 deaths
Major League Baseball outfielders
Philadelphia Athletics players
Baseball players from Pittsburgh